Love & Hope & Sex & Dreams is the debut studio album by the American rock band BoDeans, released on 16 April 1986 on Slash/Warner Bros. The album was produced by T-Bone Burnett. The album title comes from the lyrics to the Rolling Stones song "Shattered." It reached number 115 on the Billboard 200 chart.

Overview
In 1985, the band was signed to Slash/Warner Bros and traveled to Los Angeles to begin work on their debut record shortly thereafter. The album was recorded at Sunset Sound with T-Bone Burnett along with engineers David Tickle and Tchad Blake. Due to his in-demand role as a producer, Burnett was often absent for days at a time during tracking and would return to check the band's progress and give direction. There was some tension during the sessions over how elaborate the production should be. Burnett believed that some of the band's ideas did not fit the simplicity of their songs. In addition, the band were running up high studio costs and was forced to complete the album before they felt it was finished. Despite this, the band were happy with the album and it has often been regarded as their finest work.

Reception
Music critic Mark Deming, writing for AllMusic, wrote of the album: "While this music was simple at heart, the BoDeans' passion and sincerity gave it strength, and T Bone Burnett's production allowed this band to sound as big as all outdoors. The BoDeans would enjoy greater success down the road, but they never made an album as powerful and satisfying as Love & Hope & Sex & Dreams, where their hearts and their guitars were in perfect sync."

Track listing
All songs by Kurt Neumann and Sam Llanas unless otherwise noted
"She's a Runaway" – 3:36
"Fadeaway" – 4:25
"Still the Night" (Neumann, Llanas, Guy Hoffman) – 4:02
"Rickshaw Riding" – 4:55
"Angels" – 3:35
"Misery" – 4:38
"The Strangest Kind" (Neumann, Llanas, John Sieger) – 3:40
"Say You Will" – 4:04
"Ultimately Fine" – 2:18
"That's All" – 3:25
"Lookin' for Me Somewhere" – 3:02

Personnel
BoDeans
 Kurt Neumann – vocals, guitars
 Sam Llanas – vocals, acoustic guitar
 Guy Hoffman – drums, (vocal-track 3)
 Bob Griffin – bass
Additional musicians
 T-Bone Burnett – acoustic guitar (tracks 3 and 10)
 Alex Acuña – percussion
 Mitchell Froom – organ
Technical
Matt Mahurin - cover photography

References

1986 debut albums
Albums produced by T Bone Burnett
Slash Records albums
Warner Records albums
BoDeans albums